Dolfach is a village in Powys, Wales, located on the main A470 road between Llanbrynmair and Talerddig. The village's name translates as "small meadow".

External links
Photos of Dolfach and surrounding area on Geograph

Villages in Powys